The sixth season of Workaholics premiered on Comedy Central on January 14 and concluded on March 17, 2016, with a total of 10 episodes.

Cast

Main

Starring
Blake Anderson as Blake Henderson
Adam DeVine as Adam DeMamp
Anders Holm as Anders "Ders" Holmvik

Also starring
Jillian Bell as Jillian Belk
Erik Griffin as Montez Walker
Maribeth Monroe as Alice Murphy

Recurring
Kyle Newacheck as Karl Hevacheck
Bill Stevenson as Bill

Guest
Liam Hemsworth as Cushing Ward
Dane Cook as JP Richman
Pauly Shore as himself
Andy Dick as Mr. Buckley
Alexandra Daddario as Donna
Sarah Baker as Sara
Zoe Jarman as Zoey 
Stephen Root as Carty
Alex Borstein as Colleen Walker
Brittany Snow as Erin Mantini 
Clark Duke as Trilly Zane
Whitney Cummings as Juliette
Rob Corddry as Eric
Rob Huebel as Sam
Matt Besser as Dan Yella

Production
On July 9, 2015, Comedy Central renewed Workaholics for a sixth and seventh season respectively.

Episodes

Notes

References

External links
 
 

2016 American television seasons